William T. Rhodes was a footballer who played one game at full-back for Burslem Port Vale in March 1894.

Career
Rhodes joined Burslem Port Vale in July 1893. He would have made his debut at Lincoln City on 24 February, but failed to turn up after missing his train. Instead, he made his first start in a 6–4 defeat to Wolverhampton Wanderers at the Athletic Ground on 5 March in the Staffordshire Senior Cup Second Round. He played one Second Division match before being released, probably in 1896.

Career statistics
Source:

References

Year of birth missing
Year of death missing
English footballers
Association football fullbacks
Port Vale F.C. players
English Football League players